Jurasik is a surname. Notable people with the surname include:

Peter Jurasik (born 1950), American actor
Mariusz Jurasik (born 1976), Polish handball player